ZS, Zs, zS, or zs may refer to:

Businesses and organizations
 Azzurra Air (IATA airline designator ZS)
 Zombie Squad, a disaster preparedness group
 ZS Associates, a consulting firm
 Greens of Serbia (Zeleni Srbije), a political party in Serbia
 Healthy Serbia (Zdrava Srbija), a political party in Serbia

Places
 American Samoa (World Meteorological Organization country code ZS)
 Szczecin, a city in Poland identified by the vehicle registration code ZS

Science and technology
 Zeptosecond, a unit of time equal to 10−21 seconds
 Zeptosiemens, an SI unit of electric conductance
 Zettasiemens, an SI unit of electric conductance
 Zettasecond, a unit of time equal to 1021 seconds
 Zs, the category for "Separator, Space" characters in the Unicode standard

Other uses
 Zs (band), a musical group from Brooklyn, New York, United States
 Hungarian zs, the last (forty-fourth) letter of the Hungarian alphabet, following z
 MG ZS, a car made by MG Rover

See also
 Sz (disambiguation)